Agino Selo may refer to:

Agino Selo, Banja Luka, Bosnia & Herzegovina
Agino Selo, Kumanovo, North Macedonia